Makury, or Makury Naga (sometimes spelled Makuri), is a Naga language of India and Myanmar. Shi (2009:3) and Saul (2005:25) suggest that Makury may be an Ao language.

Classification
Makury is not close to other Naga languages that fall under Konyak-[Tangshang] and Angami-Zeme. Makury falls under the proposed Ao-Tangkhul linguistic group of southern Naga languages and is close to Naga languages that fall under said language group. Müvlë (Longphuri) are a sub-tribe of Makury. In Eastern Nagaland and Myanmar, the Makury, Somra Tangkhul and Para are closer than the other tribes in the north in terms of language (Makury Tribal Council).

Hsiu (2021) classifies Makury as a sister of the Central Naga (Ao) languages.

Geographical distribution
Makury is spoken in Leshi Township, Homalin Township, and Lahe Township in Hkamti District, Sagaing Region, Myanmar. There are about 40,000 speakers in Myanmar, and about 25,000 in India.

Dialects
Ethnologue lists the following dialects of Makury.

Mëkheotlë
Sengphüvlë
Aralë
Jilë

Jongphüvlë (listed as Kyaungphuri in Ethnologue) is a Makury clan name (Makury Tribal Council).

Shi (2009:5) lists the following dialects of Makury.
Phuvle, Makheotle
Sengphuvle, Muvle, Jeile

References

Saul, Jamie D. 2005. The Naga of Burma: Their festivals, customs and way of life. Bangkok, Thailand: Orchid Press.
Shi, Vong Tsuh. 2009. Discourse studies of Makuri Naga narratives. MA thesis, Chiang Mai: Payap University.
Shintani, Tadahiko. 2018. The Makuri language. Linguistic survey of Tay cultural area (LSTCA) no. 117. Tokyo: Research Institute for Languages and Cultures of Asia and Africa (ILCAA).
Language and Social Development Organization (LSDO). 2006. A sociolinguistic survey of Makuri, Para, and Long Phuri Naga in Layshi Township, Myanmar. Unpublished manuscript.

Languages of Nagaland
Kuki-Chin–Naga languages
Languages of Myanmar